John Callis may refer to:

 John Callis (pirate), 16th-century Welsh pirate
 John Benton Callis, American businessman, soldier and politician